Paldai is a village in the Manipur state of India. One of the oldest villages along the western region of Kana river, it is located in the Chakpikarong Sub-Division of the Chandel District. Originally, the geographical boundaries were once at the mouth of Kana river in the north and "Suonnoupa Muol" in the south, and the hill ranges extending between these two in the west.

It was pioneered and founded by Helchin Taithul. He was succeeded by his eldest son (L)Elizer Thangpu Taithul. It was one of the villages in India established a century before India achieved its independence. It is about 90–100 km from Imphal. The village number is 270919.

Transportation 

The village can be accessed through the National Highway No. 59, or the Indo-Burma road from Imphal via  Sugnu and then Chakpirong, then to Paldai.
According to the recorded administrative division of the Government of India, Paldai is under the subdivision of Chakpikarong, Chandel District, Manipur.

Administration 

The social and legal administrative systems in Paldai are based on the Kuki(Zo) customary law and order, which is a hereditary type. As of 2016, the head of the administration is Mr. T. Chinlianpau Zou, the eldest grandson of Helchin Taithul. Beside the General Assembly, there is a council of members called "The Village Authority," consisting of 11 members, in accordance with the provisions of the Constitution of India. These two governing bodies assist the headman of the village in crucial issues.

Paldai is served by the Chakpikarong police station and post offices.

Demographics 

According to the 2011 census:

 Males: 306, females: 269
 Total: 575
 No. of persons between ages 0-6: 52 males and 37 females
 Sex ratio - ST: 877  Children: 712
 Number of Households (Census of India 2011): 134
 Literacy (2011)
 Male: 86.6%
 Female: 84%

References

Villages in Chandel district